Luigi Pistilli (19 July 192921 April 1996) was an Italian actor of stage, screen, and television.

At one time Pistilli was one of Italy's most respected actors of stage, screen, and television. In theater, he was considered one of the country's finest interpreters of Bertolt Brecht's plays in The Threepenny Opera and St Joan of the Stockyards. 

He is known to Italian horror movie buffs mainly for his three 1972 thrillers Twitch of the Death Nerve, Iguana with the Tongue of Fire and Your Vice is a Locked Room and Only I Have the Key. Pistilli committed suicide in 1996 at age 66.

Biography

Born in Grosseto, Pistilli studied acting at Milan's Piccolo Teatro, graduating in 1955. Although he went into acting in films, he never completely severed his ties with the theater and often returned to appear in plays directed by Giorgio Strehler.

He  appeared in many Spaghetti Westerns such as The Good, the Bad and the Ugly (1966) (as the priest Pablo Ramírez, brother of Eli Wallach's character Tuco) and in For a Few Dollars More (1965) as the cunning second-in-command Groggy (his first credited film role). He played the murderous Albert in the Mario Bava giallo Twitch of the Death Nerve (A Bay of Blood) in 1971. He had a regular role on the popular Italian television Mafia drama La piovra (The Octopus). He also appeared as the main villain in Death Rides a Horse (1967).

After a role in the 1970 Charles Bronson thriller Cold Sweat, in 1972 he appeared in two giallo films Iguana With the Tongue of Fire and Your Vice Is a Locked Room and Only I Have the Key (playing an alcoholic), and appeared as an exorcising priest in the 1974 cult horror film The Eerie Midnight Horror Show (aka The Sexorcist).

Death
Pistilli committed suicide in his home in Milan just before he was scheduled to appear in the final performance of Terence Rattigan's Tosca on 21 April 1996. The program was panned by critics and audiences, and that might have contributed to Pistilli's state of mind. However, according to his suicide note, Pistilli had suffered deep despair after making bitter public comments regarding the recent end of a four-year off-stage relationship with singer/actress Milva. In his note he apologized to her for the spiteful statements released in the published interview.

Selected filmography

Walter e i suoi cugini (1961) – Man discussing with Tavolini (uncredited)
For a Few Dollars More (1965) – Groggy (Indio's Gang)
One Hundred Thousand Dollars for Lassiter (1966) – Danny
Texas, Adios (1966) – Hernandez
The Good, the Bad and the Ugly (1966) – Father Pablo Ramírez
We Still Kill the Old Way (1967) – Arturo Manno
Death Rides a Horse (1967) – Walcott
La lunga sfida (1967) – Paynes
The Sweet Body of Deborah (1968) – Philip (starring Carroll Baker)
Roma come Chicago – Banditi a Roma (1969) – Colangeli
The Great Silence (1968) – Henry Pollicut
The Libertine (1968) – Otto Frank, aka Mr. X
The Protagonists (1968) – Tassoni
L'amante di Gramigna (1969)
The Lady of Monza (1969) – Count Fuentes
Machine Gun McCain (1969) – Duke Mazzanga
Eagles Over London (1969) – Maj. Krueger
La notte dei serpenti (1969) – Lieutenant 'The Snake' Hernandez
Dead of Summer (1970) – Doctor Volterra
Cold Sweat (1970) – Fausto Gelardi (starring Charles Bronson)
Veruschka – poesia di una donna (1971) – Luigi the manager
Twitch of the Death Nerve (1971) aka A Bay of Blood – Albert
The Case of the Scorpion's Tail (1971) – Inspector Stavros
The Iguana with the Tongue of Fire (1971) – Detective John Norton
Caliber 9 (1972) – Mercuri
Your Vice Is a Locked Room and Only I Have the Key (1972) – Oliviero
A White Dress for Marialé (1972) – Paolo
Tragic Ceremony at Villa Alexander (1972) – Lord Alexander
Il gatto di Brooklyn aspirante detective (1973) – Tony Mangialafoglia
The Black Hand (The Birth of the Mafia) (1973) – Don Nunzio Pantaleo
Number One (1973) – Carabinieri commander
One Way (1973) – Javier
Silence the Witness (1974) – Inspector De Luca
The Eerie Midnight Horror Show (1974) aka The Sexorcist – Father Xeno
 The Suspects (1974) – Marcello Angiotti
The Killers Are Our Guests (1974) – Commissario Di Stefano
Cagliostro (1975) – Cardinal de Rohan
Due Magnum .38 per una città di carogne (1975) – Commissario Perri
Sins Without Intentions (1975) – Stefania's Stepfather
 (1976) – Commissario
La principessa nuda (1976) – Marco
Illustrious Corpses (1976) – Cusan
Confessions of a Frustrated Housewife (1976) – Doctor Carlo
Antonio Gramsci: The Days of Prison (1977) – Gennaro Gramsci
Mamma Ebe (1985) – Roberto Lavagnino
Una casa in bilico (1986)
Mal d'Africa (1990)
L'amante senza volto (1993) – Athos Magnani

References

External links

1929 births
1996 deaths
1996 suicides
20th-century Italian male actors
Italian male film actors
Italian male stage actors
Italian male television actors
Male Spaghetti Western actors
People from Grosseto
Suicides by hanging in Italy